Surya Bikram Gyawali (born 10 June 1898 – 1 December 1985) was a Nepali historian. He wrote biographies for numerous people including King Prithvi Narayan Shah and writer Bhanubhakta Acharya. Gyawali also served as a head teacher in Darjeeling. He is also a recipient of the Order of Gorkha Dakshina Bahu (first class), the Order of Tri Shakti Patta (second class), and the Tribhuvan Puraskar (1971).

Biography 
Gyawali was born on 10 June 1898 (Bikram Sambat: 1955 Jestha 29) in Benaras, British India to Ditta Til Bikram and Parvati Devi. His family had migrated to Benaras from Gulmi. He made a remarkable contribution to the Nepali language, literature, culture and history. He wrote biographies for Prithvi Narayan Shah and Bhanubhakta Acharya. Gyawali, Dharanidhar Koirala, and Parasmani Pradhan were known as "SuDhaPa" who were living in exile in Darjeeling. From 1923 to 1953, he worked at Government High School in Darjeeling later being promoted to a head teacher. 

After the 1951 Nepalese revolution, Gyawali moved to Kathmandu. Gyawali served as a Chancellor of the Nepal Academy. He also worked for the Department of Archeology and he was a member of the Rastriya Panchayat. Nepalese artist Lain Singh Bangdel was highly influenced by Gyawali. Surya Bikram Gyawali Marg, a road in Kathmandu is named after him. He was awarded the Order of Gorkha Dakshina Bahu (first class), the Order of Tri Shakti Patta (second class), and the Tribhuvan Puraskar (1971).

Notable works 

 Kabi Bhanubhakta ko Jivan Charitra; 
 Nepali Birharu
 Bir Itihas
 Nepal Upatyakako Madhyakalin Itihas
 Prithvi Narayan Shah (1977)

References

Citations

 

1898 births
1985 deaths
Members of the Order of Gorkha Dakshina Bahu, First Class
Members of the Order of Tri Shakti Patta, Second Class
20th-century Nepalese historians
Nepalese male writers
People from Varanasi